Prešov Air Base  is a military airport located in Prešov, a city in the Prešov Region in Slovakia.

Facilities

See also
 Slovak Air Force

References

External links
 
 
 

Military of Slovakia
Slovak airbases
Buildings and structures in Prešov Region